Don O'Kelly, (March 17, 1924 – October 2, 1966) was an American actor prominent in the 1950s and 1960s mostly on television.  Though credited as "Don Kelly" in earlier performances, his billing was changed to "Don O'Kelly" in 1960.

Background

Donald Patrick Kelly was born at Sheepshead Bay  in Brooklyn, New York to an Irish-American father (Robert J. Kelly) and Norwegian-American mother (Rachel Marie Knudsen). He saw convoy duty at San Juan, Puerto Rico; Iceland; England; Scotland; North Africa (Invasion), the European Theater; Africa; Italy; convoy duty to Scotland; Africa; Iceland; Southern France (Invasion) through Channel into Pacific and then on to the Carolinas; Siapan; Tinian; Marshalls; Gilbert; Iwo Jima; Okinawa, and the Sea of Japan (when World War II ended). He saw active duty four years, three months, and 17 days and then went home.

Kelly received an honorable discharge after the war and upon separation joined his cousin's ice skating show. O'Kelly used his GI Bill of Rights to study acting with the Strasberg company in Hollywood, California.

Career
Don O'Kelly began his career starring in Tank Battalion with Marjorie Hellen (later Leslie Parrish). O'Kelly was a familiar face to series television fans during the 1950s and 1960s. His last starring role was in The Hostage, made in 1966 and released in 1967, for which he received very favorable reviews.

TV and film credits

 The Hostage (1967) ... Bull
 Shoot Out at Big Sag (1962) ... Fargo
 Frontier Uprising (1961) ... Kilpatrick
 Tank Battalion (1958) ... Sgt Brad Dunne aka Korean Attack
 The Notorious Mr. Monks (1958) ... Dan Flynn
 Bombers B-52 (1957) ... Master Sergeant Darren McKind aka No Sleep Till Dawn (UK)
 The Crooked Circle (1957) ... Joe Kelly
 The Big Land (1957)... Billy Tyler aka Stampeded (UK)
 The Wild Wild West (1965) episode The Night of a Thousand Eyes ... Peavey
 Gunsmoke (1965) episode Eliab's Aim ... Dealer
 Ben Casey (1964) episode One Nation Indivisible ... George Zybsko
 Bonanza (1964) episode The Lila Conrad Story
 The Virginian (1963) episode The Evil That Men Do ... Deke
 The Dakotas (1963) episode Fargo ... Paul Young
 The Gallant Men (1963)episode The Leathernecks ... Captain Barlow
 77 Sunset Strip (1963) episode Crashout ... Arnie Martin
 The Gallant Men (1962) episode One Moderately Peaceful Sunday
 77 Sunset Strip (1962) episode Terror in a Small Town ... Sheriff Farger
 The Beachcomber (1962) episode The Fugitive ... Womack
 Ripcord (1961) episode High Jeopardy ... Johnny Grimes
 77 Sunset Strip (1961) episode The Turning Point ... Nate Minton
 Bat Masterson (1961) episode Meeting at Mimbers ... Green River Tom Smith
 Riverboat (1960) episode Zigzag ... Clyde
 Bat Masterson (1960) episode The Elusive Baguette as “Reed Morgan”
 The Deputy (1960) episode Lady for a Hanging ... Hunter
 Bat Masterson (1960) episode The Last of the Night Raiders ... Jack Doolin
 Tombstone Territory (1960) episode Girl From Philadelphia ... as outlaw Ben Quade
 The Twilight Zone (1960) episode The Mighty Casey ... Monk
 Overland Trail (1960) episode Fire in the Hole ... Red
 77 Sunset Strip (1960) episode Vacation with Pay ... Adams
 Bourbon Street Beat (1960) episode Neon Nightmare ... George Johnson
 Lawman (1960) episode The Truce M Squad (1960) episode Race to Death ... Joe Calhoun
 Laramie (1960) episode Duel at Alta Mesa The Alaskans (1960) episode The Trial of Reno McKee ... Carl
 The Alaskans (1960) episode Black Sand Have Gun – Will Travel (1960) episode The Day of the Bad Man ... Amos Saint
 Bonanza (1960) episode El Toro Grande The Restless Gun (1959) episode A Very Special Inspector ... Blair Weeks
 Tales of Wells Fargo (1959)episode The Daltons ...Bob Dalton
 Black Saddle (1959) episode Client: Reynolds ... Harry Briggs
 Lawman (1959) episode The Souvenir ... Virgil Carey
 Disneyland (6 March 1959) episode The Slaughter Trail ... Jed
 Texas John Slaughter (1959) episode (#1.5) The Slaughter Trail ... Jed
 Disneyland (20 March 1959) episode Man from Bitter Creek ... Jed
 Texas John Slaughter (1959) (#1.6) Man from Bitter Creek ... Jed
 Sugarfoot (1959) episode The Giant Killer ... Tracy
 The Texan (1959) episode A Quart of Law
 Maverick (1958) episode Holiday at Hollow Rock ... Ira Swain
 77 Sunset Strip (1958) episode The Court Martial of Johnny Murdo ... Sergeant Bannock
 Lawman (1958) episode The Oath ... Lou Menke
 Broken Arrow (1958) episode War Trail ... Captain Baker
 Have Gun – Will Travel (1958) episode The Teacher ... Coley
 Maverick (1958) episode Trail West to Fury ... Jett
 Wire Service (1957) episode Misfire
 Frontier (1956) episode A Somewhere Voice ... Jim
 Death Valley Days (1956) episode The Sinbuster
 Frontier (1956) episode The Well ... Jim

Personal life

Kelly and his wife, Ruth Kelly, had three sons. Don Kelly died of stomach cancer in Culver City, California shortly after "The Hostage" was released and just prior to leaving on a national tour promoting the film.

References

External links

1924 births
1966 deaths
20th-century American male actors
American male television actors
American male film actors
Male actors from New York City
American people of Irish descent
American people of Norwegian descent
People from Sheepshead Bay, Brooklyn
Military personnel from New York City
Deaths from cancer in California
United States Navy personnel of World War II